The women's 20 kilometres walk event at the 2015 European Athletics U23 Championships was held in Tallinn, Estonia, on 10 July.

Medalists

Results

Final
10 July

Participation
According to an unofficial count, 24 athletes from 14 countries participated in the event.

References

20 kilometres walk
Racewalking at the European Athletics U23 Championships